Kurt J. Matzdorf, also known as Kurtheinz J. Matzdorf (1922 – 2008), was a German-born American jewelry designer, metalsmith (which included silversmith, goldsmith) and an educator. He was Professor Emeritus at State University of New York at New Paltz and he founded the metals department. Matzdorf was known for his religious objects in metal.

Early life and education 
Kurt J. Matzdorf was born May 26, 1922 in Stadtoldendorf, Germany, to parents Alice Frank and Wilhelm Matzdorf. His family was Jewish. In 1939, he was brought to England on a kindertransport. His mother was either murdered in Chełmno extermination camp near Ljublin on 20 April 1941 or Hadamar Euthanasia Centre on 11 February 1941. His father was murdered in Sachsenhausen labour camp on 28 January 1942. 

During World War II, he attended Slade School of Fine Art in London and studied with the sculptor Benno Elkan in Oxford. In 1949, he moved to the United States, where he studied goldsmithing and metalsmithing at the University of Iowa. He was married to Alice Elinor (née Litt) and together they had two children.

Career 
After completing his studies, he taught crafts at Kansas State University in Manhattan, Kansas from 1955 to 1957. Matzdorf founded the metals program and taught at State University of New York at New Paltz (SUNY New Paltz), from 1957 until 1985. He was a Professor Emeritus of Gold and Silversmithing. In 1970, thirteen years after starting the metals program, he was joined by Robert Ebendorf. Matzdorf had notable students, including Barbara Seidenath and Lisa Gralnick.

Matzdorf was known for his contemporary Judaica silversmithing and goldsmithing, and he created objects like menorahs, kiddush cups, and synagogue jewelry. In 1992, Matzdorf was awarded the title Fellow by the American Craft Council (ACC). He also designed and created a series of ceremonial maces and chains of office for colleges and universities in the United States.

His work is included in public museum collections such as at the Jewish Museum, Jüdisches Museum Berlin, Museum of Fine Arts, Houston, among others.

References 

1922 births
2008 deaths
Alumni of the Slade School of Fine Art
University of Iowa alumni
State University of New York at New Paltz faculty
People from New Paltz, New York
Jewish American artists
American metalsmiths
American people of German-Jewish descent
German emigrants to the United States
20th-century American Jews
21st-century American Jews
American jewelry designers